Light Eternal is an album by Dave Fitzgerald released in 1999.

This is the third solo album from flute and saxophone player Dave Fitzgerald, a founding member of Iona.

Track listing
 "Veni Veni - O Come, O Come Emmanuel"
 "Light"
 "Christchild"
 "Only Jesus"
 "The Dream"
 "Light - Vocal Response"
 "Golgotha"
 "Steal Away"
 "When I Survey The Wondrous Cross"
 "The Lark Ascending"
 "Peace Be With You"

Personnel
Dave Fitzgerald - Soprano & Tenor Saxophones, Flutes, Assorted Woodwind

Release details
1999, UK, ICC Records ICCD20330, Release Date 10 August 1999, CD
1999, UK, ICC Records ICC20320, Release Date 10 August 1999, Cassette
1999, U.S., Rhythm House Records RHD4250, Release Date 10 August 1999, CD

1999 albums
Dave Fitzgerald albums